Andy Ariel Najar Rodríguez (born 16 March 1993) is a Honduran professional footballer who plays as a defender for Major League Soccer club D.C. United and the Honduras national team.

Early life 
Najar moved with his family from Honduras to the United States at the age of thirteen, settling in the Washington metropolitan area. Najar attended Thomas A. Edison High School in Alexandria, Virginia and joined D.C. United's youth academy in 2008. During his time with the academy program, Najar received numerous awards and honours for his outstanding play at right back, being named to the USSF Development Academy Starting XI in 2009. He was also the leading scorer of the 2009 US Developmental Academy Finals in Los Angeles.

Club career

D.C. United 
Najar signed a professional Generation Adidas contract with D.C. United on 22 March 2010. Once part of MLS, the league and his team became responsible for his education. He was the second player to sign with the first team directly from United's Academy, after goalkeeper Bill Hamid who signed with the first team in September 2009. 

Najar made his professional debut on 27 March 2010, in DC's opening game of the 2010 MLS season against the Kansas City Wizards, and scored his first professional goal on 28 April 2010 in a US Open Cup game against FC Dallas. Najar was voted MLS Rookie of the Year for the 2010 season, ahead of Tim Ream and Danny Mwanga.

Najar was considered by pundits such as Soccer America's Paul Gardner to be one of D.C. United top players already, at the young age of 17. He received interest from European clubs, according to his agent, and was expected to move his services there later in his career, possibly as soon as the end of the 2010 season. However, it was announced in December 2010 that Najar had signed a multi-year contract with D.C. United.

Najar was the only player from the D.C. United's Academy to be called up to compete in the 2012 Olympics.

Anderlecht 
On 7 January 2013, Najar moved to Belgian Pro League champions Anderlecht on a one-month loan. On 30 January 2013, Anderlecht finalised the full transfer of Najar. The reported transfer fee was $3 million.
He made his debut against Cercle Brugge on 2 August 2013, coming on as a 79th-minute substitute.
On 22 October 2014, Najar opened the scoring for Anderlecht in the second half of their Champions League match against Arsenal but two late goals for the English side ensured a 2−1 defeat for the Belgian champions.

After a summer 2019 injury, Najar did not play for Anderlecht for over a year.

Los Angeles FC 
In February 2020, Najar trained with LAFC during their preseason.
On 17 June 2020, Najar returned to Major League Soccer, signing with Los Angeles FC, who earlier in the year had traded $350,000 in General Allocation Money to Nashville SC in exchange for the first selection spot in the league's Allocation Ranking. Following the 2020 season, LAFC declined their contract option on Najar.

Return to D.C. United 

After being released by LAFC, Najar went full circle by trying out with former club D.C. United in the hopes of making it back to first-team competition. After a six-week trial period, the Black-and-Red signed him to a one-year deal with an option for two more years. On 17 April 2021, Najar made his first appearance for United since returning, coming on in the 88th minute in the 2–1 win over New York City FC. Najar scored his first MLS goal since his return on 8 August, in a 2–1 win over CF Montréal.

International career 
On 6 April 2011, Najar formally announced that he would play for the Honduras national team, choosing his birth nation rather than wait to be eligible to represent the United States, where he had yet to receive citizenship. He made his first appearance for Honduras on 3 September 2011, against Colombia entering in the 67th minute.

Najar was called up to compete for the Honduras U23 national team in the 2012 Olympics.

On 21 July 2013, Najar scored his first international goal for Honduras in the knockout stages of the 2013 CONCACAF Gold Cup vs Costa Rica. Najar's game-winner in the 1–0 victory saw Honduras advance to the semi-finals of the tournament.

Career statistics

Club

Honours 
Anderlecht
 Belgian Pro League: 2012–13, 2013–14, 2016–17
 Belgian Super Cup: 2013, 2014

Individual
 MLS Rookie of the Year: 2010
 RSC Anderlecht Player of the Season: 2015–16, 2016–17

Notes

References

External links
 
 
 

1993 births
Living people
People from Choluteca Department
Honduran footballers
Association football fullbacks
Association football wingers
Honduras international footballers
D.C. United players
R.S.C. Anderlecht players
Los Angeles FC players
Major League Soccer players
Belgian Pro League players
Olympic footballers of Honduras
Footballers at the 2012 Summer Olympics
2013 CONCACAF Gold Cup players
2014 FIFA World Cup players
2015 CONCACAF Gold Cup players
Thomas A. Edison High School (Fairfax County, Virginia) alumni
Homegrown Players (MLS)
Honduran people of Salvadoran descent
Sportspeople of Salvadoran descent
Honduran expatriate footballers
Honduran expatriate sportspeople in the United States
Expatriate soccer players in the United States
Honduran expatriate sportspeople in Belgium
Expatriate footballers in Belgium